Hackney Empire is a theatre on Mare Street, in the London Borough of Hackney. Originally designed by Frank Matcham it was built in 1901 as a music hall, and expanded in 2001. Described by The Guardian as ‘the most beautiful theatre in London’ it is an Arts Council England National Portfolio Organisation.

History
Hackney Empire is a grade II* listed building.  The theatre was built as a music hall in 1901, designed by the architect Frank Matcham. Architecture scholar Nicholas Pevsner described the "splendid Hackney Empire, with its ornate terracotta exterior and sumptuous seventy-seven galleried auditorium" as a key example of Victorian and Edwardian architecture. There is a statue of Thalia, the Greek muse of comedy, on the roof of the theatre: this was removed in 1979, but later reinstalled.

Charlie Chaplin, W. C. Fields, Stanley Holloway, Stan Laurel, Marie Lloyd and Julie Andrews all performed there, when the Hackney Empire was a music hall.

ATV bought the theatre to use as studios in the mid-1950s and shows such as Take Your Pick and Oh, Boy! were broadcast live. Certain episodes of Opportunity Knocks were also filmed at the theatre. Some scenes from Emergency – Ward 10 were also filmed there. From 1963 to 1984, the theatre was used by the Mecca Organisation as a bingo hall; wrestling matches also occurred there during the 1960s.

In 1984, Mecca found the building too expensive to maintain as a bingo hall, and it was offered to Cartoon Archetypical Slogan Theatre (CAST), a satirical touring theatre group, headed by Claire and Roland Muldoon, as a London base. They also mounted successful variety nights headlined by a new breed of alternative comedy acts, such as Ben Elton, Dawn French, and Jennifer Saunders.

The theatre was threatened with demolition, and in 1986, actor-manager Roland Muldoon mounted a campaign to acquire the freehold and to re-open the Hackney Empire as a permanent performance space; allowing the theatre to return to theatrical use for its 85th anniversary.

Ralph Fiennes played Hamlet to Francesca Annis' Gertrude in Jonathan Kent's Almeida Theatre Company production of Hamlet, 28 February – 30 March 1995; the production also transferred to the Belasco Theatre in New York City. In 1996, mime/choreographer  Lindsay Kemp premiered Variété''', his first British production in over 20 years, there and Slava's Snowshow, featuring the famous Russian clown Slava Polunin, played the theatre several times.

Stand-up comedy
Hackney Empire was a leading centre in the alternative comedy boom of the 1980s, and remains a venue for comedy.

Comedians who have performed at the venue include Frankie Boyle, Jack Whitehall, Jo Brand, Russell Brand, John Cleese, Jackie Clune, Greg Davies, Felix Dexter, Ben Elton, Harry Enfield, Craig Ferguson, Dawn French, Jeremy Hardy, Lily Savage, Lenny Henry, Bill Hicks, Harry Hill, Mark Linn-Baker, Martha Lewis and Eve Polycarpo, Paul Merton, Jennifer Saunders, Arthur Smith, Mark Steel, and Tim Vine.

Modern times

Hackney Empire’s artistic programme includes theatre, opera, comedy, dance and music.  Hackney Empire collaborate and partner with regional and international companies and artists including the Royal Shakespeare Company, English Touring Opera, Scottish Opera and the BBC Concert Orchestra.

In 2001, the Empire closed for a £17m refurbishment project designed by Tim Ronalds Architects with Carr and Angier acting as theatre consultants. It was reopened in 2004. The restoration included the addition of a 60-seat orchestra pit to make the Empire suitable for opera performances by companies such as English Touring Opera, the addition of a flytower with provision for counterweight flying and a reduction of the stage rake from 1 in 24 to 1 in 30. Among other new facilities were a studio theatre and educational and hospitality facilities, and greatly improved dressing rooms.

Additionally, the Marie Lloyd public house was incorporated into the new extension. In addition to Muldoon, the comedian Griff Rhys Jones led the restoration appeal, with a large donation coming from local businessman Alan Sugar. The theatre received another grant of £400,000 from Arts Council England in 2019 to make building improvements and increase community outreach.The John Bishop Show was presented and recorded at the Hackney Empire and aired on BBC One from 30 May 2015 to 18 July 2015. Since 2014, the British Soap Awards have also been filmed at the Hackney Empire.

It has produced pantomimes since 1988, providing free tickets to local Housing Associations, Community Groups, local refuges and young carers.

Alongside its main-stage programme, Hackney Empire provides performing arts activities for local young people. Its Creative Futures programme works with over 4,000 young people annually, aged 14 – 25, and run a Community Choir that over 80 regular members.

The theatre was closed to the public from March 2020 to August 2021. In December 2021, the venue celebrated its 120th birthday with a performance of Jack and the Beanstalk.

On 11 June 2022, the theatre was the setting for "The British Soap Awards" televised live on ITV.

Transport
The area is served by bus routes 30, 55,106, 236, 254, 276, 277, 394,D6,W15,N55, N253, N277.

The nearest station is Hackney Central on London Overground's North London Line.

The nearest Tube station, Bethnal Green on the central line, is over a mile away.

Patrons
 Harold Pinter (died 2008)
 Griff Rhys Jones
 Lord Alan Sugar
Leona Lewis

References

External links
 Official website
 History of the Hackney Empire with archive images
 Collection of Hackney Empire Playbill Posters  from the University of East London's Theatre Archive
 Guide to British Theatres 1750–1950'', John Earl and Michael Sell pp. 114 (Theatres Trust,  2000) 
 Griff Rhys Jones – Hackney Empire – Art and Architecture

Television studios in London
Theatres in the London Borough of Hackney
Media and communications in the London Borough of Hackney
Grade II* listed buildings in the London Borough of Hackney
Former music hall venues in the United Kingdom
Former theatres in London
Grade II* listed theatres
20th-century architecture in the United Kingdom
Hackney, London
Hackney Central